The second season of Nikita, an American television drama based on the French film La Femme Nikita (1990), the remake Point of No Return (1993), and a previous series La Femme Nikita (1997), was announced on May 17, 2011, which premiered on September 23, 2011, at 8:00 pm (ET). The season featured 23 episodes.

Cast

Main cast
 Maggie Q as Nikita Mears
 Shane West as Michael Bishop
 Lyndsy Fonseca as Alexandra "Alex" Udinov
 Aaron Stanford as Seymour Birkhoff
 Dillon Casey as Sean Pierce
 Melinda Clarke as Helen "Amanda" Collins
 Xander Berkeley as Percival "Percy" Rose

Recurring cast
 Rob Stewart as Roan
 Lyndie Greenwood as Sonya
 Noah Bean as Ryan Fletcher
 Peter Outerbridge as Ari Tasarov
 Devon Sawa as Owen Elliott
 Alberta Watson as Senator Madeline Pierce
 Peter J. Lucas as Sergei Semak
David S. Lee as Phillip Jones

Episodes

References

External links
 
 

2011 American television seasons
2012 American television seasons
Season 2